Brother is the third studio album by The Scene Aesthetic. It was released on November 2, 2010.

Track listing

Personnel
Andrew de Torres  – guitar, vocalsEric Bowley – vocalsCary Brothers - additional vocals on the 7th track

References

2010 albums
The Scene Aesthetic albums